Ikechi Uko (born 12 January 1964) is a Nigerian travel business consultant, travel promoter, tourism development expert, media consultant, journalist and author. He is the organizer of Akwaaba African Travel Market, the first international travel fair in West Africa; Abuja Bantaba; and organizer, Accra Weizo and Port Harcourt Bantaba. He is the CEO of Jedidah Promotions (an international media and tourism marketing firm for airlines, hotels and destinations across Africa); project director of Seven Wonders of Nigeria (Naija7Wonders), and  publisher of Africa Travel Quarterly Magazine and atqnews.com.

Early life

Ikechi Uko is from Abia State, Nigeria. He was born on 12 January 1964 into the family of Mr Samson Uko and Mrs Salome Uko, née Azubuike. At a young age, Uko had an eye on travel. He could give up anything to discover new places. He attended National Secondary School Nike, Enugu. He worked as ticketing officer with Nigeria Airways ABC in Enugu. He studied Geography at the University of Ibadan and graduated in 1985. He did his National Youth Service Corps in Bauchi State, from where he moved to Kano State and taught in Gwarzo Secondary School, Gwarzo, and Rogo Secondary School, Rogo. In 1988, he returned to the University of Ibadan to obtain his Msc in Geography with emphasis on environmental planning and remote sensing. He graduated in 1990 and went ahead to obtain certificate in Journalism from Times Institute of Journalism and Prince2 Practitioners Licence. His father played a huge role in cementing his passion, travel: Mr Samson Uko worked with the Nigerian Railway Corporation and kept books. As a child, Ikechi spent his holidays reading those books and travelling to new places in the course of his father's job. His late mother, Mrs Salome Uko, a teacher, steered his early life towards Geography and taught him lessons in enterprise.

Career 
The Abia State born travel enthusiast, whose dressing is incomplete without a hat or a neck scarf, is a very well traveled person, traveling close to 200 days in a year. He was editor of Tourism Factfinders, a book on Nigeria published to mark Nigeria's hosting of The Organization of African Unity (OAU) summit in 1991. In 1991 to 1992 he was tourism editor of Happy Land, Happy World tourist Guide. Happy Land, Happy World was the Nigerian version of Disneyland, Disney World, a project that did not materialize when its Certificate of Occupancy was revoked by the Lagos State Government. Realizing the lack of literature that deeply documents the unique festive celebrations in Nigeria, in 1998 he published Festivals In Nigeria in collaboration with The Nigerian Tourism Development Corporation (NTDC).
 
His passion for traveling and adventures led him to the publication of Travelers Weekend Magazine, a weekly magazine in 1996,  along which he launched Travelers Awards. Travelers Weekend was the first regular travel magazine in West Africa. With the aim for the magazine to set the pace and to be Africa's forerunner in the travel world, in 2003 Travelers Weekend Magazine was rebranded as African Travel Quarterly (ATQ). In 2004 he launched Travelers Awards and Exhibitions, the first attempt at introducing an exhibition into the travel environment. In 2005, Travelers Awards and Exhibition was rebranded as Akwaaba African Travel Market. Akwaaba African Travel Market is the only international travel fair in West Africa. With participation from international dealers in travel, tourism, aviation and the hospitality industries, it is regarded as "’Where Africa meets the world". Akwaaba African Travel Market is designated by the Nigerian Tourism Development Corporation (NTDC) as the official travel exhibition in Nigeria. It is the only international travel expo in West Africa in partnership with NTDC, listed by United Nations World Tourism Organization (UNWTO), partner event with National Association of Nigerian Travel Agencies (NANTA) and the only member of International Tourism Trade Fairs Association (ITTFA) in West Africa

In 2010, with the ATQ magazine team, he set up a committee to choose the 7 wonders of Nigeria, popularly known as Naija7Wonders. This was inspired by the poems of Pliny the Elder on the ancient wonders of the world and the ancient principles of Philo of Byzantium's collection of marvels from around the world. After a thorough and detailed search of two years by tourism, hospitality and tour experts, with public voting, in 2012, the project team published the man made wonders of Nigeria, and the seven most sensitive, critical and exquisitely unique of them were selected as the Naija seven wonders (Naija7Wonders). These are the man-made wonders of Nigeria driven by the vision of the Marcel Proust quote: "The journey of Discovery is not in seeing new things but in seeing old things with new eyes".
Naija7wonders, Nigeria most dramatic, breathtaking and unique man-made structure, is endorsed by national bodies and associations in tourism, and applauded by international organizations.  One of the least known of the seven wonders of Nigeria sites, the Benin moat was visited by UNESCO led by Prof.Wole Soyinka, and former Director General of Nigerian Tourism Development Corporation, Otunba Segun Runsewe referred to the Naija7Wonders as an epoch in the advancement of tourism development in Nigeria.

Having noticed that in Nigeria most travel businesses concentrate on Lagos without taking cognizance of the huge travel potentials in other northern states, especially Abuja, being the capital of Nigeria, on 5 July 2011, he launched Abuja Bantaba, a one-day speed dating event between investors and clients in the travel and tourism business., It also includes workshop that keep participants informed of what are going on in those industries to keep with pace with the rest of the world. In celebration of the centenary of Nigeria, on 25 April 2014, the 4th edition of Abuja Bantaba honored 100 personalities who are key players to tourism development in Nigeria.

In 2013, he launched atqnews.com, the online version of African Travel Quarterly Magazine. According to Uko, it focuses on forecast, market and political analyses, which observe development in the areas of travel, transport and tourism from a global perspective and the impact of these on the economies of countries.

On 3 July 2015, he launched Accra Weizo, an event which is targeted at the founding vision of ECOWAS: to create a region of one people integrating and growing together. Accra Weizo rallies travel professionals together to meet minds and work out a pathway for the future of the Africa region, hosting tourism, aviation and immigration key players and decision makers.

In August 2015, he was appointed as the international tourism consultant to the Calabar Carnival

Ikechi Uko is presently pushing his proposal to build an aviation museum for Nigeria using abandoned aircraft as exhibits. He said that the project would promote Nigeria's tourism; empower and educate a new generation of aviators; draw international investors in the aviation industry to Nigeria and would serve as an ‘’ eye- opener’’  to look and work for a brighter future in the aviation industry.

Awards and appointments

In 2008, he was appointed a member of the tourism committee Nigeria Vision 2020 in the administration of President Umaru Musa Yar'Adua.

In July 2014, at the 10th anniversary of Kwita Izina, the annual gorilla naming ceremony in Rwanda, one of the most prestigious festivals in Rwanda, Uko was chosen by the government of Rwanda as a representative of Nigeria to be a namer.
In 2015, he was appointed consultant to the Calabar Carnival 2016 by the Cross River State governor, Prof. Ben Ayade, with the vision to reposition Calabar Carnival as the number one carnival event in Africa. As the international tourism consultant for the 2016 Calabar International Festival, Ikechi Uko brought in over ten countries across the continents of the world to participate in the Calabar International Festival. With the success of 2016 Calabar Carnival, he was reappointed in 2016 for the 2017 edition. Ikechi Uko vast expertise in tourism was in sheer display at the Calabar Carnival 2017, with accolades on the Cross River State government in hosting the event to international standard to the delight of tourists, international investors and Nigerians.

In January 2016, The African Sun Times, Africa's number one and largest newspaper in America, awarded Mr. Ikechi Uko, as its Tourism Ambassador of the Year 2015. According to the organizers of the Award, The award came on the heels of Ikechi's ardent practical tourism promotion and development campaign in Nigeria and Africa through different pet projects showcasing the beauty and richness of Africa to the world.

At the 2017 MICE East Africa Forum and Expo held in Addis Ababa, Ethiopia, Ikechi Uko was presented with the 2016 MICE East Africa's Tourism and Hospitality Personality Award. The Award was presented to him on his contributions towards the developments of tourism, travel and hospitality businesses and investments in Africa.

References

External links
 

1964 births
21st-century Nigerian businesspeople
Branding consultants
Igbo businesspeople
Living people
Businesspeople in mass media
Nigerian publishers (people)
Travelers
University of Ibadan alumni
Nigerian consultants